Pokémon: The First Movie is the soundtrack to the first Pokémon film in the North American markets. Some of the songs were featured in the animated short Pikachu's Vacation, and some songs did not feature in either the short or the movie at all. The CD contains extra features, such as Pokémon videos and a screensaver. When it was released, it included a promotion to send in a proof of purchase for an exclusive Jigglypuff card from the Pokémon TCG.

Alongside this soundtrack, the orchestral score from the movie was also released on the CD Pokémon: The First Movie Original Motion Picture Score.

The soundtrack was released on Atlantic Records, a sister company to Warner Bros., the film's distributor outside Japan.

Track listing 

* These tracks were not in the movie itself, but were part of Pikachu's Vacation.
** These tracks were not in the movie or the short at all.

Personnel

98° - Composer, Primary Artist, Vocal Arrangement, Vocal Producer
Lars Aass - Arranger
Josh Abbey - Engineer
Christina Aguilera - Composer, Performer, Primary Artist
Stig Anderson - Composer
Alan Armitage - Assistant Engineer
B*Witched - Performer, Primary Artist
Chris Bailey - Assistant Engineer
Ashley Ballard - Performer, Primary Artist
Mikey Bassie - Composer
Billie - Performer, Primary Artist
Blessid Union of Souls - Primary Artist, Producer
Steve Boyer - Engineer
Jimmy Bralower - Arranger, Composer, Drum Programming, Drums, Engineer, Mixing, Percussion, Producer
Derek Brin - Drum Programming, Keyboards, Synthesizer
Chris Brooke - Assistant
Emma Bunton - Composer, Primary Artist, Vocals, Vocals (Background)
Gary Carolla - Arranger, Drum Programming, Keyboard Programming, Mixing, Producer
Aaron Carter - Performer, Primary Artist
Elaine Caswell - Vocals (Background)
Will Catterson - Engineer
Todd Chapman - Composer, Drum Programming, Keyboards, Producer
Vivian Cherry - Vocals (Background)
Rob Chiarelli - Mixing
Melanie Jayne Chisholm - Composer
Billy Crawford - Performer, Primary Artist
LaShawn Daniels - Composer
Russ Desalvo - Composer
Josh Deutsch - Composer, Guitar, Producer, Programming
Tim Donovan - Engineer, Mixing Engineer
Jerry "Wonda" Duplessis - Composer
Emosia - Producer
Ron Fair - Executive Producer
Colleen Fitzpatrick - Composer, Vocals (Background)
Sherree Ford-Payne - Vocals (Background)
Humberto Gatica - Mixing
Brad Gilderman - Mixing
Andy Goldmark - Composer
Jeff Golub - Guitar
Nikki Gregoroff - Vocals (Background)
Jeff Griffin - Mixing Assistant
Halle - Composer
Darren Higman - Executive Producer
Garry Hughes - Keyboards, Producer, Programming
Neil Jason - Arranger, Musician, Producer, Vocals (Background)
k. - Performer, Primary Artist
Craig Kallman - Executive Producer
Jerry Lane - Mixing
Marit Larsen - Composer
Rhett Lawrence - Composer, Engineer, Mixing, Producer, Programming
Emily Lazar - Mastering
John Loeffler - Executive Producer, Producer, Vocals (Background)
Tom Lord-Alge - Mixing
Mario Lucy - Engineer
Steve Lunt - Composer
M2M - Performer, Primary Artist
Mandah - Performer, Primary Artist
Brandon Mason - Mixing Assistant
Harvey Mason, Jr. - Assembly, Engineer, Producer
Harvey Mason, Sr. - Composer
Charles McCrorey - Assistant Engineer
Andrew McIntyre - Guitar (Electric)
Vaughn Merrick - Engineer, Mixing
Midnight Sons - Performer, Primary Artist
Joanie Morris - Production Coordination
Mark Mueller - Composer
B.J. Nelson - Vocals (Background)
Steven Nikolas - Composer, Engineer, Musician, Producer, Programming
NSYNC - Performer, Primary Artist
P - Performer, Primary Artist
Dave Pensado - Mixing
Dan Petty - Guitar (Acoustic)
Doug Petty - Keyboards
Janice Prendergast - Production Coordination
Lloyd Puckitt - Engineer
Kaj Robole - Arranger, Engineer, Mixing, Producer
Guy Roche - Arranger, Keyboards, Producer, Synthesizer
Arif St. Michael - Vocals (Background)
Tom Schick - Assistant Engineer
Mark Schulman - Guitar
Brendon Sibley - Engineer, Musician, Producer, Programming
John Siket - Engineer
Frank Simms - Vocals (Background)
Britney Spears - Primary Artist, Vocals (Background)
Brian Steckler - Clapping, Composer, Engineer, Musician, Producer, Vocals
Biti Strauchn - Vocals (Background)
Chris Theis - Engineer, Mixing Engineer
Vaneese Thomas - Vocals (Background)
Darryl Tookes - Vocals (Background)
Chris Trevett - Engineer, Mixing
Michael Tucker - Digital Editing, Engineer
Angela Via - Performer, Primary Artist
Vitamin C - Performer, Primary Artist
Kieran Wagner - Assistant Engineer
Diane Warren - Composer
Bruce Watson - Guitar
Eric Foster White - Arranger, Composer, Engineer, Keyboards, Mixing, Producer
Robert Wieger - Product Manager
Holly Wormworth - Soundtrack Coordination
Scott Young - Assistant Engineer
David Zippel - Composer
Peter Zizzo - Bass, Composer, Guitar, Keyboards, Producer

Charts

Weekly charts

Year-end charts

Certifications and sales

Score 

Alongside this soundtrack, the orchestral score from the movie was also released on the CD Pokémon: The First Movie Original Motion Picture Score.

Track listing 
 "The Birth of Mewtwo"
 "Dragonite Takes Flight"
 "Invitation to Danger"
 "Surviving the Storm"
 "Mewtwo's Island"
 "Pokémon Vs. Clone"
 "Tears of Life"
 "This Is My World Now"
 "Three on Three"
 "Mew's Theme"
 "Freeing Charizard"
 "Adventure in Paradise"
 "All Good Things Must End"

Sound Picture Box: The Birth of Mewtwo 
 consists of two discs. The first disc contains episodes of the Japanese radio serial , released only in Japan and later adapted into The Uncut Story of Mewtwo's Origin. The second disc contains full score of the original Japanese release of the film in addition to two theme songs sung in Japanese.

Synopsis 
The first three episodes of the drama mirror the anime short seen in The Uncut Story of Mewtwo's Origin, describing the circumstances behind Mewtwo's creation under a team of scientists and the tragic loss of his first friend, Amber. However, the last two episodes take place during the start of the first movie, after the prologue ends. The drama also goes into detail the leadership of Team Rocket under Madame Boss and the last known whereabouts of Miyamoto (ミヤモト), the mothers of Team Rocket members Giovanni and Jesse respectively.

Track listing 
 Disc one
 
 
 
 Also titled "Mewtwo and Amber"
 
 

 Disc two
 
 
 
 
 
 Re-recording of the Japanese opening theme of Pokémon: Indigo League
 
 
 Also titled "Flying Dragonite"
 
 
 
 
 
 
 
 
 
 
 
 
 
 
 
 
 
 

References 

1990s film soundtrack albums
Atlantic Records soundtracks
1999 soundtrack albums
Pop soundtracks
Songs from Pokémon
Anime soundtracks